Ilkeston is a town in the Borough of Erewash, Derbyshire, England, on the River Erewash, from which the borough takes its name, with a population at the 2011 census of 38,640. Its major industries, coal mining, iron working and lace making/textiles, have now all but disappeared.

The town is close to both Derby and Nottingham and is near the M1 motorway and the border with Nottinghamshire. The eastern boundary of Ilkeston is only two miles from Nottingham's western edge and it is part of the Nottingham Urban Area.

History and culture

Ilkeston was probably founded in the 6th century AD, and gets its name from its supposed founder, Elch or Elcha, who was an Anglian chieftain ("Elka's Tun" = Elka's Town). The town appears as Tilchestune in the Domesday Book of 1086, when it was owned principally by Gilbert de Ghent. Gilbert also controlled nearby Shipley, West Hallam and Stanton by Dale. Ilkeston was created a borough by Queen Victoria in 1887.

Ilkeston is one of several places where the distinctive dialect of East Midlands English is extensively spoken. Ilkeston is referred to as 'Ilson' in this dialect. Generally the name is pronounced with three syllables, Ilkisstun, not Ilk's tun.

The American Adventure, a large theme park which closed in 2007, was located on the outskirts of Ilkeston on the former Woodside Colliery adjoining Shipley Country Park.

The NatWest Hole Ilkeston, an architectural tourist attraction outside the Bath Street branch of NatWest bank gained much media interest when Tripadvisor decided to suspend reviews in February 2020.

Stanton Ironworks

One of the biggest and most important local employers was the Stanton Ironworks, later known as Stanton and Staveley – the continuation of a long-standing tradition of iron working in this area.  There has been evidence of iron working and quarrying in the area since Roman times, and the industry began blossoming into a huge industrial concern in the 1780s. By the mid-19th century there were several blast furnaces and the production rose from around 500 tons of pig iron per month to 7,000 at the end of the century. The Stanton Ironworks acquired a number of smaller ironstone quarrying and ironworks companies. These included the Wellingborough Iron Company in 1932.

Steel pipe manufacturing began at Stanton after World War I and later concrete pipes were produced, Stanton being the first in the UK to develop the 'spun pipe' process. 

In the mid-19th century the works produced 20,000 tons of iron castings per year, 2.5 millions by 1905. Up to 12,500 people were employed during the period when the works were part of British Steel Corporation, of which 7,000 worked at the Stanton works.

During its long existence the works produced huge quantities of a variety of products, including pig iron, tunnel castings, (used in projects such as the London Underground), pipes and street furniture as well as bitumen, roadstone, chemicals and munition casings.

The works gradually declined, the business being run from 1985 by the French Saint-Gobain Group.  The last casting was an emotional event in 2007. The huge Stanton site has been partially given over to business park and the rest of the site is earmarked for redevelopment which is subject to local opposition.

Ilkeston Charter fair
Ilkeston Market Place is the site of a Charter fair. The fair celebrated its 770th anniversary in 2022, the Charter being granted by King Henry III in 1252. This makes the fair older than Nottingham's famous Goose Fair and it is one of the largest street fairs in the Country, indeed in Europe.

The present fair developed from two separate fairs, as another 'agricultural hiring fair' or 'Statutes Fair' was traditionally held on Wakes week in October as well as the original Charter Fair which was held on the Feast of the Assumption of the Blessed Virgin Mary (15 August). The two fairs were combined in 1888 and the one Charter Fair has been held in October ever since.

Since 1931 the fair has been officially opened by the Mayor - first of Ilkeston and since 1974 of Erewash - on the Fair Thursday at noon with the Town Clerk (Chief Executive) reading the Charter from the steps of the Town Hall.

Transport

Railway

Ilkeston did not have a railway station from 1967 to 2017, despite its substantial population and the fact that the Erewash Valley Line (formerly part of the Midland Railway, later the LMS) skirts the eastern edge of the town. Ilkeston once had three railway stations. Ilkeston Junction station, also known as "Ilkeston Junction & Cossall" was on the former Midland Railway and later LMS Erewash Valley Main Line: this station closed in January 1967. A short branch led from this station to Ilkeston Town station, at the north end of Bath Street, which closed to passengers in June 1947.

Ilkeston's third station was Ilkeston North, on the former Great Northern Railway (later LNER) line from Nottingham to Derby Friargate station, closed in September 1964. Once threatened with demolition, it is now a Grade 2 listed building, though the line and embankments have long since been removed. The Viaduct has been the subject of much renewed interest and has been reopened to the public as part of a cycleway and footpath.

Following a long-running local campaign, in March 2013 Transport Secretary Patrick McLoughlin announced that Ilkeston was one of three sites 'most likely' to get a new station as part of the 'New Stations Fund', costing £5 million and sited close to the old Ilkeston Junction station. On 15 May 2013 it was announced this new station would be built, which would be named Ilkeston station. It has two platforms, which can take six trains per hour with up to six passenger cars and includes waiting shelters. A 150 space car park, cycle storage, bus stop, drop off point and taxi rank are also on site. The station is unmanned with automated ticket machines. 

Due to flood prevention work and the discovery of great crested newts, the opening was significantly delayed, the new station opened on 2 April 2017.

Buses
TrentBarton operate the majority of buses around Ilkeston including the Ilkeston Flyer into Derby, TheTwo and 21 into Nottingham, 33 to Mansfield, My15 to Long Eaton and East Midlands Airport
Notts + Derby and CT4N operate some Derbyshire County Council tendered routes around Ilkeston.

Ilkeston spa baths
From early in the 19th century the existence of natural mineral waters was noted here and exploited. A local businessman Thomas Potter built, in 1831, the famous Ilkeston Bath at the bottom of Town Street attached to the Rutland Hotel. For over 60 years the baths helped tourism to the town at a time when spa towns like Bath and Harrogate enjoyed popularity.  'If you're doubled in pain and thin as a lath, Come at once then and try, the famed Ilkeston Bath,' was a well known advertising slogan. A mixture of a general decline in the popularity of spa bathing and, reportedly, contamination of the waters from mining activities led to the eventual closure of the baths just before 1900. The baths and the adjacent Rutland Hotel, which also enjoyed a revenue from tourism, no longer exist though they are remembered in the name of 'Bath Street'.

Sport

Football
 The original Ilkeston Town was liquidated in 2010 after a 114-year history. Ilkeston FC was formed the following year, which was in turn liquidated in 2017. However, by July 2017 a new club, Ilkeston Town F.C. founded by the former owner of Notts County Alan Hardy, replaced the liquidated Ilkeston FC, and the new club's home ground was established on the New Manor Ground, on Awsworth Road.

Rugby
 Ilkeston Rugby Club (known as the "Elks") is a Rugby union club founded in 1926. The home ground is based at 'The Stute', Hallam Fields Road.

Cricket
 Ilkeston Rutland Cricket Club (established in 1829) is based on Rutland Sports Park. The club currently has 4 senior teams in the Derbyshire County Cricket League, and a well established Junior section playing competitive cricket in the Erewash Young Cricketers League.

First-Class County games
Every season between 1925 and 1994, the Derbyshire County Cricket Club played up to a couple of first-class cricket matches on the Rutland Recreation Ground, and one-day matches between 1970 and 1994.

Tennis
 Ilkeston Tennis Club is based on Rutland Sports Park and is a member of the Derby Tennis League. It is claimed to be the largest tennis club in Ilkeston, offering tennis for all ages and abilities as well as professional coaching. Facilities include 4 Outdoor Tennis Courts and 3 indoor tennis courts.
 Stanton Tennis Club is a private tennis establishment situated at The Stute Hallam Fields Road, sports complex. There are 3 private tennis courts at this tennis facility.

Basketball
 Ilkeston Outlaws Basketball Club, established 1966, field's teams in the local Sherwood Basketball League and the Basketball England National League. The Ilkeston Outlaws Basketball Club have two main junior basketball teams: the Ilkeston Hawks and Ilkeston Falcons for ages 4–18 years.

Golf
 Ilkeston Borough Golf Club was founded in 1929 and has access to a 9-hole course (known as 'Pewit Golf Course') located off West End Drive, Ilkeston. The Course is owned, managed and maintained by Erewash Borough Council.

Twin towns 

Ilkeston is twinned with:
  Châlons-en-Champagne in France, since 1957.

Notable residents 
Samuel Taylor (1816–1875), the famous 'Ilson Giant' who reached the height of 7' 4", was born nearby at Hallam Fields. His grave in Stanton Road Cemetery was restored by the Cemetery's Friends in 2008.
 William Roache, who plays Ken Barlow in Coronation Street, grew up in Ilkeston. He now holds the world record as the longest-serving actor to play the same role continuously, having been with the show since its inception in December 1960.
 Robert Lindsay, the stage and television actor probably best known for his parts in Citizen Smith and latterly My Family, was born as Robert Lindsay Stevenson in Ilkeston on 13 December 1949. Before he became an actor he worked at the nearby Stanton & Staveley steel works and also attended the Ilkeston detachment of the Army Cadet Force.
 Linda Armstrong, an actress, born in Ilkeston
 Robert Holmes FRGS (born 1943), photographer, author and adventurer. Member of the RGS 150th Anniversary expedition to the Karakoram, Fellow of the Explorers Club of New York.
 John Paxton (1819–1868), cricketer
 Ben Roberts who played Chief Inspector Derek Conway in ITV's The Bill

Gallery

See also 
Listed buildings in Ilkeston
Ilkeston Corporation Tramways
Ilkeston Grammar School
Ilkeston Community Hospital

References

External links

 Ilkeston & District Local History Society

 
Towns in Derbyshire
Populated places established in the 6th century
Charter fairs
Unparished areas in Derbyshire
Borough of Erewash